The 22nd Infantry Regiment "Cremona" is an inactive unit of the Italian Army last based in Fossano. Founded in 1848 the regiment is part of the Italian army's infantry arm and named for the city of Cremona.

History 
On 1 October 1848 the Royal Sardinian Army raised the 21st Infantry Regiment and 22nd Infantry Regiment for service in the First Italian War of Independence. The two regiments were formed with volunteers from Lombardy and together with the 19th Infantry Regiment and 20th Infantry Regiment they formed the Lombardian Division. The four regiments were disbanded in 1849 after the Sardinian defeat in the war.

After the Second Italian War of Independence the Austrian Empire had to cede the Lombardy region of the Kingdom of Lombardy–Venetia to the Kingdom of Sardinia. After taking control of the region the government of Sardinia ordered the army on 29 August 1859 to raise five infantry brigades and one grenadier brigade in Lombardy. Subsequently on 1 November 1859 the Brigade "Cremona" was activated with the 21st and 22nd infantry regiments, which had been re-raised on 29 August 1859.

The brigade was quickly sent to Southern Italy to suppress the popular revolt of the peasant population against the annexation of the Kingdom of the Two Sicilies into the new Kingdom of Italy. In 1866 the brigade fought in the Third Italian War of Independence.

In 1912 the regiment's II Battalion fought in the Italo-Turkish War, for which the battalion was awarded the regiment's first Silver Medal of Military Valour.

World War I 

During World War I the brigade fought on the Italian front, for which its two regiments were each a awarded a Silver Medal of Military Valour.

Interwar years 
On 28 December 1926 the brigade assumed the name of XX Infantry Brigade and received the 88th Infantry Regiment "Friuli" from the disbanded Brigade "Friuli". The XX Infantry Brigade was the infantry component of the 20th Territorial Division of Livorno, which also included the 7th Artillery Regiment. In 1934 the division changed its name to 20th Infantry Division "Curtatone e Montanara".

On 15 September 1939 the Curtatone e Montanara transferred all its regiments, except the 88th Infantry Regiment "Friuli", to the newly activated 44th Infantry Division "Cremona" in Pisa.

World War II 

After Italy's entry into World War II the Cremona participated in the Italian invasion of France. In February 1941 the division was ordered to transfer to northern Sardinia. 

On 11 November 1942 Axis forces occupied Vichy France and the Cremona was ferried from Sardinia to southern Corsica to take control of the island. Together with the 20th Infantry Division "Friuli", 225th Coastal Division and 226th Coastal Division the division garrisoned the island until the Armistice of Cassibile was announced on 8 September 1943. After the armistice the Italian forces and French partisans on Corsica fought the German Sturmbrigade Reichführer-SS, 90th Panzergrenadier Division, and Italian XXII Paratroopers Battalion/ 184th Paratroopers Regiment "Nembo", which had crossed over from Sardinia and retreated through Corsica towards the harbor of Bastia in the island's north.

After the end of operations on Corsica the Cremona was transferred to Sardinia and then in July 1944 to southern Italy.

Now part of the Italian Co-belligerent Army the division was reorganized on 25 September 1944 in Altavilla Irpina as Combat Group "Cremona". Equipped with British weapons and materiel the group entered the front on 12 January 1945 as part of British V Corps. When allied forces achieved a major breakthrough during the 1945 spring offensive the Cremona advanced towards Venice and liberated the city on 30 April 1945.

After the war the combat group was garrisoned in Turin and on 15 October 1945 the group was renamed Infantry Division "Cremona". For their conduct in Corsica and during the Italian Campaign both regiments were awarded a Silver Medal of Military Valour.

Cold War 

On 1 October 1969 the 22nd Infantry Regiment "Cremona" in Turin was reorganized as 22nd Armored Infantry Regiment "Cremona": the regiment's infantry battalion in Fossano was transferred to the 21st Infantry Regiment "Cremona", while the other two battalions were reformed as VI Bersaglieri Battalion with M113 armored personnel carriers and XIV Tank Battalion with M47 Patton main battle tanks. The regiment also fielded a Command and Services Company and a Bersaglieri company with M40 recoilless rifles.

With the 1975 army reform the Italian Army abolished the regimental level and battalions came under direct command of the brigades and regional commands. Therefore, on 29 October 1975, the 22nd Armored Infantry Regiment "Cremona" and the XIV Tank Battalion were disbanded, while the VI Bersaglieri Battalion was renamed 6th Bersaglieri Battalion "Palestro" and transferred to the 3rd Mechanized Brigade "Goito". On the same day the IV Battalion of the 21st Infantry Regiment "Cremona" in Fossano was reformed as 22nd Infantry Battalion "Primaro" (Recruits Training). The battalion was given the flag and traditions of the 22nd Infantry Regiment "Cremona".

On 15 December 1989 the battalion was placed in reserve status and on 2 November 1990 it was disbanded and its flag transferred to the Shrine of the Flags in the Vittoriano in Rome.

References 

Infantry Regiments of Italy